Kersey is a kind of coarse woollen cloth that was an important component of the textile trade in Medieval England.

History
It derives its name from kersey yarn and ultimately from the village of Kersey, Suffolk, having presumably originated in that region. However the cloth was made in many places. It was being woven as early as 1262 in Andover, Hampshire, where regulations prohibited the inclusion of Spanish wool in kerseys. By 1475, the West Riding of Yorkshire including Calderdale was also a major producer, while Devon and Somerset were major producers and exporters until the manufacture later moved to serge making. Kersey was a lighter weight cloth than broadcloth. English kerseys were widely exported to central Europe and other places: a surviving business letter from the end of the 16th century recommends trading kerseys for good wine on the Canary Islands.

Description
Kersey yarns were spun in large gauges (thicknesses) from inferior carded wool, and made thick and sturdy cloth. Kersey was a warp-backed, twill-weave cloth woven on a four-treadle loom. 

The back of the cloth was napped and shorn after fulling, producing a dense, warm fabric with a smooth back.

See also
Jersey (fabric)

References

External links

Calderdale site
Textile terms 

Woven fabrics
Kersey, Suffolk